The General Assembly of Prince Edward Island is the unicameral legislature of the province of Prince Edward Island, Canada, consisting of the lieutenant governor of Prince Edward Island (Crown-in-Parliament) and the Legislative Assembly of Prince Edward Island. The legislature was first established in 1773.

Like the Canadian federal government, Prince Edward Island uses a Westminster-style parliamentary government, in which members are elected to the Legislative Assembly through general elections. The party with the most seats forms Government. A Premier of Prince Edward Island and Executive Council of Prince Edward Island are formally appointed by the lieutenant governor in the name of The King.  The premier acts as Prince Edward Island's head of government, while the King of Canada acts as head of state.

The legislature was originally bicameral, with an upper house called the Legislative Council of Prince Edward Island and a lower house called the House of Assembly of Prince Edward Island. The Legislative Council also held executive power until 1839. In 1893 the houses were amalgamated into the Legislative Assembly of Prince Edward Island. Unlike other provinces that eliminated their upper house, the assembly continued to have a distinction between members elected as Councillors and members elected as Assemblymen. This distinction was eliminated in 1996, giving all members the title Member of the Legislative Assembly, upon the change from dual ridings (two members per district) to single ridings (one member per district) in the Legislative Assembly.

List of Assemblies

See also
 List of Prince Edward Island general elections (post-Confederation)

References

External links 
 Journal of the House of Assembly of Prince Edward Island
 Prince Edward Island, garden province of Canada, WH Crosskill (1904)
 List of historical election dates

 
General Assembly